Meghe Dhaka Tara may refer to:
 Meghe Dhaka Tara (1960 film), a film directed by Ritwik Ghatak
 Meghe Dhaka Tara (2013 film), a film directed by Kamaleshwar Mukherjee
 Meghe Dhaka Tara (play), a 2016 play directed by Bratya Basu